A soundboard is a computer program, Web application, or device, formerly created in Adobe Flash, that catalogues and plays many audio clips. Soundboards are self-contained, requiring no outside media player. In recent years soundboards have been made available in the form of mobile apps available on iPhone App Store and Google Play. Since Adobe and web browser developers deprecated support for Flash, HTML5-based soundboards have gained popularity in recent years.

Prank calling
Traditionally, builders take sound clips said by celebrities and combine them into one software program. They are most often used in prank calls, when the caller uses the soundboard to imitate a celebrity or other well-known person. The individual on the other end of the call is usually deceived into thinking that they are actually talking to a real person. In some cases, the victim associated with the prank call has no idea who the person from the soundboard is, with one famous example being Mitt Romney pranking his father by using a Arnold Schwarzenegger soundboard. Recordings of soundboard prank calls are popular on the web, especially on video sharing sites such as YouTube. Soundboard prank-calling is often done with caller ID spoofing or masking, to provide a high level of anonymity or impersonation. The goal is often to create confusion or test how long the victim(s) will remain on the phone. Most soundboard pranksters do not hang up the phone first, rather see how long it takes for the victim to hang up first.

Other uses
The soundboard is also used to facilitate humor, highlighting some of celebrities' more unusual utterances, or allowing for juxtaposition or even "composition" of quotes and sounds that would otherwise not go together.

The soundboard has also been used as a promotional tool for films, television shows, radio, products and more. 

Call Centers are adopting soundboard technology. Though more limited in its scope and applications, soundboards are one type of agent-assisted automation, a specialized call center technology which improve productivity. For example, soundboards seem to be primarily used for outbound telemarketing. Because the technology effectively eliminates agent accents, the telemarketing work can be done by lower cost agents in offshore locations.

Soundboard software for online games
Thanks to the popularization of online videogames and communication tools through the Internet, different soundboard software has appeared. Note the following developments: EXP Soundboard (open source and compatible with WAV and MP3 audio files), Resanance (dedicated only to be used with Discord) or Voicemod (combining a voice changer, a voice generator and a soundboard in the same app.)

See also 
 Cyberstalking

 Internet troll

References

Prank calling